The cinema of Oman is very small. There is only one Omani film, Al-Boom (2006), . Partly inspired by Samuel Beckett's Waiting For Godot, Al-Boom deals with the challenges facing a small fishing community.

A joint US-Indian-Omani production, Pirate's Blood, starring Sunny Leone was co-produced by Stegath Dorr in 2008.  Stegath Dorr's film Blood Desert was released in 2014, many years after it premiered at the 2006 Oman Film Festival. A few Hollywood movies have been partly filmed in the country.

An annual film festival is held in Muscat.

Films shot in Oman 
 Blood Desert (filmed in 2006)
 Killer Elite (2011)
 Operation Oman (2014)
 Pirate's Blood  (Hollywood) (2010)
 Given more than i had  (Bollywood, Director - Renny Johnson) (2016)
 Personal Shopper (Hollywood) (2016)
 Once Upon ay Time in Mumbai Dobaara! (2013)

See also

 Cinema of West Asia
 Cinema of the world

References

External links
 Oman Film Society official site
 The Hindu article about Indian-Omani film links
 Article about the prospects for Oman's film industry
 Gulf News article on 'Al-Boom'
  Small article on 'Al-Boom'
 Interview with Khaled Abdul Raheem Al-Zadjali
 IMDB entry for Oman

 
Omani culture